United Nations Security Council Resolution 262 was adopted unanimously on December 31, 1968. After hearing statements from Israel and Lebanon, the Council condemned Israel for its premeditated military action in violation of its obligation under the Charter and the cease-fire resolutions. It issued a solemn warning to Israel that, if there were a repeat incident, the Council would have to consider further steps to enforce its decisions and considered that Lebanon has suffered and responsibility rests with Israel.

See also
1968 Israeli raid on Lebanon
Arab–Israeli conflict
List of United Nations Security Council Resolutions 201 to 300 (1965–1971)

References 
Text of the Resolution at undocs.org

External links
 

 0262
 0262
Israeli–Palestinian conflict and the United Nations
 0262
 0262
December 1968 events